Phil Jones (born 1 January 1960) is a New Zealand cricket umpire. He stood in his first One Day International (ODI) match on 8 November 2014 between Hong Kong and Papua New Guinea in Australia. He stood in his first Twenty20 International (T20I) match on 7 January 2016 between New Zealand and Sri Lanka. He was a member of the International Panel of Umpires and Referees until June 2016, when he was demoted to New Zealand's national panel.

See also
 List of One Day International cricket umpires
 List of Twenty20 International cricket umpires

References

External links
 

1960 births
Living people
New Zealand One Day International cricket umpires
New Zealand Twenty20 International cricket umpires
People from Auckland